Federico Martín Aramburú (20 January 1980 – 19 March 2022) was an Argentine rugby union footballer.

Biography 
He was born in La Plata, and primarily played as a wing but could also play centre for Glasgow Warriors in the Pro12, and also for Argentina.

In joining the Glasgow squad in the summer of 2010 he joined his fellow Argentine international Bernardo Stortoni who was the first choice full back at the club. Since his international debut in April 2004, in a match against , Martín Aramburú had played 22 times, (17 starts and 5 appearances from the bench) scoring eight tries, including one against  in the 2007 World Cup. Of his 17 international starts six have been at outside centre, three at inside centre, and four on each wing. He previously spent much of his career in France with US Dax, USA Perpignan and originally with Biarritz Olympique.

He was killed on 19 March 2022, in a drive-by shooting after an argument in a bar in Paris.  The killer is believed to be the far-right activist Loïk Le Priol, already known for acts of violence. On 23 March, the suspect was arrested in Hungary, according to French prosecutors.

Honours
Champion of France with Biarritz 2005–06 and 2004–05

References

External links
 UAR player profile
 stats at itsrugby.fr
stats at scrum.com

1980 births
2022 deaths
Sportspeople from La Plata
Argentine people of Basque descent
Argentine rugby union players
Rugby union centres
Biarritz Olympique players
USA Perpignan players
US Dax players
Glasgow Warriors players
Argentina international rugby union players
Argentina international rugby sevens players
Deaths by firearm in France
People murdered in France
Argentine people murdered abroad